Jane Davis Doggett (born 1929) is a graphic artist and pioneer designer of wayfinding and graphics systems for airports.

Biography

Education
Doggett grew up in Nashville, Tennessee.  She graduated from Sophie Newcomb College (Tulane University, New Orleans, LA) in 1952  and Yale University School of Art and Architecture in 1956 with an MFA in graphics, where she worked under noted colorist Josef Albers, who had recently been appointed Head of Yale's Graphic Design department. "As an early student of Josef Albers, she took his famed Interaction of Color course and absorbed Albers’ inspired principles of color perception while establishing her own strong artistic identity."
<p>
See  Spectrum News article</a>

Early Work Experience
Her first job after graduate school was with George Nelson, working on the anthropological part of the permanent exhibit at Colonial Williamsburg, Virginia.  She then worked in Europe for the magazine Architectural Record, photographing architects and engineers and their work.

Her first airport design job was for the Memphis airport in 1959.  The project's architect Roy Harrover knew Doggett from both Nashville and Yale and brought her in to do the graphics. Her first innovation was the development of a standardized font for use throughout the airport.  This font became Doggett's trademarked “Alphabet A” and was used in many subsequent airport projects, since it was very readable over long distances.

Additional airport projects included Tampa International, George Bush-Houston, Baltimore-Washington, Newark, Miami, Fort Lauderdale-Hollywood, and Cleveland-Hopkins among others.

As of 2014, Doggett had designed the wayfinding systems for 40 major airport projects, which is said to be “more than any other designer in the world.” Each year, 20 million airplane passengers are guided by her way-finding signage and graphics.

Wayfinding Systems
Doggett is credited with four innovations that are now commonly employed in airports and other large public spaces:
 Use of color,  letter, and symbol  to guide visitors through large unfamiliar places.
 Designs that begin on highways outside the structure, simplifying and making the wayfinding process safer for drivers  or other travelers while also reducing the number of signs needed.  Doggett's system eliminated two-thirds of the highway signs that had originally been proposed for the Tampa airport.
 Building the verbal or symbolic message into the architecture rather than tacking it on as a sign.
 Creating a visual symbol to brand the airport and represent it as a gateway to the surrounding region.

Further Design Work
Other notable graphics and design projects that she has worked on include Madison Square Garden, the Philadelphia subway system, the Whitney Museum of American Art, Niagara Falls International Convention Center, Jones Hall for the Performing Arts in Houston, and Fairfax Hospital in Virginia.  Doggett's designs have been awarded the American Institute of Architects’ National Award of Merit, the Progressive Architecture Design Award,  American Iron and Steel Institute's Design in Steel Citation, and two Design Awards co-sponsored by the U.S. Department of Transportation and the National Endowment for the Arts.

In her fine art work since 2007, Doggett has developed the concept of the Iconochrome,  which she has described as “geometric designs in colors expressing philosophically profound messages.” She has also described an Iconochrome as a colorful image or “Icon, an image with meaning, plus chrome, color.” Her work has been exhibited at the Yale University Art Gallery.; Tennessee State Museum, Nashville; Armory Art Center, West Palm Beach, FL; Tampa International Airport; Lighthouse Art Center, Tequesta, FL; Northern Trust, North Palm Beach, FL; Maritime and Classic Boat Museum, Jensen Beach, FL; Chapter Two, Corea, ME; College of the Atlantic, Bar Harbor, ME; Littlefield Gallery, Winter Harbor, ME; Elliott Museum, Stuart, FL.

Books 
Doggett, J. D. (2007). Talking Graphics: A Book of Iconochrome Images. Exartis Publishers.

References 

Yale School of Art alumni
Tulane University alumni
1929 births
Living people
American graphic designers
Women graphic designers